Věžky is a municipality and village in Kroměříž District in the Zlín Region of the Czech Republic. It has about 400 inhabitants.

Administrative parts
The village of Vlčí Doly is an administrative part of Věžky.

References

Villages in Kroměříž District